Serratella serrata is a species of spiny crawler mayfly in the family Ephemerellidae. It is found in North America.

References

External links

 

Mayflies
Articles created by Qbugbot
Insects described in 1911